Zakharuiyeh Rural District is a rural district (dehestan) in Efzar District, Qir and Karzin County, Fars Province, Iran. At the 2006 census, its population was 3,104, in 655 families.  The rural district has 16 villages.

References 

Rural Districts of Fars Province
Qir and Karzin County